The Japan women's national volleyball team (Hinotori Nippon, 火の鳥NIPPON), or All-Japan women's volleyball team, is currently ranked 6th in the world by FIVB. The new head coach is Masayoshi Manabe.

One of their greatest successes was at the 1964 Summer Olympics in Tokyo, when they defeated the heavily favored Soviet Union on the way to the gold medal. 

Japan was qualified for the 2004 Summer Olympics by winning the Women's Olympic Qualifier that was held from 8 May to 16 May in Tokyo, Japan. In Athens, Greece the team took fifth place in the overall-rankings.

Finally after almost three decades of medal drought in the Olympics, Japan took home the Bronze medal by defeating South Korea in the 2012 Summer Olympics.

History

2012 London Olympics
Japan qualified for the 2012 Summer Olympics as the best Asian team in the 2012 FIVB Women's World Olympic Qualification Tournament. In the 2012 Olympics, Japan had been placed on Group A with Russian Federation, Italy, Dominican Republic, the host Great Britain and Algeria. Japan finished third in the Group. In the quarter-finals, Japan faced their old Asian rival China. Saori Kimura and Yukiko Ebata each scored 33 points in this thrilling game in which China were beaten by 3–2. It was their first win over China in 11 years as far as FIVB games are concerned. On 9 August 2012, the Japanese were outplayed by the defending champions Brazil in the semi-finals. On 11 August 2012, Japan beat South Korea 3–0 in the bronze medal match. It is the first Olympics' volleyball medal for the Japanese since the 1984 Summer Olympics. On August 13, 2012, Japan Women's Team was ranked 3rd in the world behind United States women's national volleyball team and Brazil women's national volleyball team.

2020 Tokyo Olympics
Japan was the host nation for the 2020 Summer Olympics. The other teams in their group in Tokyo were Kenya, Serbia, Brazil, Korea and the Dominican Republic. Japan's opening match was on 25 July 2021 in Tokyo against Kenya. They beat Kenya in their first match in straight sets  and lost against Serbia, Brazil, Korea and the Dominican Republic which caused them to miss the qualification for the quarterfinals.

Winner of 6 major world titles

#, & – Twice 3 Straight Major titles in 1960s and 1970s 

(World Women's Volleyball Championship, World Cup, Olympic Games)

Results

International

Olympic Games
 1964 –  Gold Medal
 1968 –  Silver Medal
 1972 –  Silver Medal
 1976 –  Gold Medal
 1984 –  Bronze Medal
 1988 – 4th place
 1992 – 5th place 
 1996 – 9th place
 2004 – 8th place
 2008 – 7th place
 2012 –  Bronze Medal
 2016 – 8th place
 2020 – 10th place

World Championship
 1960 –  Silver Medal
 1962 –  Gold Medal
 1967 –  Gold Medal
 1970 –  Silver Medal
 1974 –  Gold Medal
 1978 –  Silver Medal
 1982 – 4th place
 1986 – 7th place
 1990 – 8th place
 1994 – 7th place
 1998 – 8th place
 2002 – 13th place
 2006 – 6th place
 2010 –  Bronze Medal
 2014 – 7th place
 2018 – 6th place
 2022 – 5th place

World Cup
 1973 –  Silver Medal
 1977 –  Gold Medal
 1981 –  Silver Medal
 1985 – 4th place
 1989 – 4th place
 1991 – 7th place
 1995 – 6th place
 1999 – 6th place
 2003 – 5th place
 2007 – 7th place
 2011 – 4th place
 2015 – 5th place
 2019 – 5th place

World Grand Champions Cup
 1993 – 4th place
 1997 – 5th place
 2001 –  Bronze Medal
 2005 – 5th place
 2009 – 4th place
 2013 –  Bronze Medal
 2017 – 5th place

FIVB World Grand Prix
 1993 – 6th place
 1994 – 4th place
 1995 – 7th place
 1996 – 8th place
 1997 – 4th place
 1998 – 7th place
 1999 – 7th place
 2000 – 8th place
 2001 – 6th place
 2002 – 5th place
 2003 – 9th place
 2004 – 9th place
 2005 – 5th place
 2006 – 6th place
 2007 – 9th place
 2008 – 6th place
 2009 – 6th place
 2010 – 5th place
 2011 – 5th place
 2012 – 9th place
 2013 – 4th place
 2014 –  Silver Medal
 2015 – 6th place
 2016 – 9th place
 2017 – 7th place

FIVB Nations League
 2018 – 10th place
 2019 – 9th place
 2021 – 4th place
 2022 – 7th place

Montreux Volley Masters
1989 –  Bronze Medal
2001 –  Bronze Medal
2005 – 4th place
2009 – 7th place
2010 – 7th place
2011 –  Gold Medal
2013 – 5th place
2014 – 6th place
2015 –  Silver Medal
2019 –  Silver Medal

Continental

Asian Games
 1962 –  Gold Medal
 1966 –  Gold Medal
 1970 –  Gold Medal
 1974 –  Gold Medal
 1978 –  Gold Medal
 1982 –  Silver Medal
 1986 –  Silver Medal
 1990 –  Bronze Medal
 1994 –  Bronze Medal
 1998 –  Bronze Medal
 2002 –  Bronze Medal
 2006 –  Silver Medal
 2010 – 6th place
 2014 – 4th place
 2018 – 4th place

Asian Championship
 1975 –  Gold Medal
 1979 –  Silver Medal
 1983 –  Gold Medal
 1987 –  Silver Medal
 1989 –  Bronze Medal
 1991 –  Silver Medal
 1993 –  Silver Medal
 1995 –  Bronze Medal
 1997 –  Bronze Medal
 1999 –  Bronze Medal
 2001 – 4th place
 2003 –  Silver Medal
 2005 –  Bronze Medal
 2007 –  Gold Medal
 2009 –  Bronze Medal
 2011 –  Silver Medal
 2013 –  Silver Medal
 2015 – 6th place
 2017 –  Gold Medal
 2019 –  Gold Medal
 2021 – Withdrew

Asian Cup
 2008 — 4th place
 2010 — 4th place
 2012 — 5th place
 2014 — 4th place
 2016 — 4th place
 2018 —  Silver Medal
 2022 —  Gold Medal

Team

Current squad
The following is the Japan roster in the 2022 World Championship

Head coach:  Masayoshi Manabe

Former squads
 1994 squad:
Head coach: Tadayoshi Yokota

 1996 Olympic Games — 9th place (tied)
Kaiyo Hoshini, Aki Nagatomi, Kazumi Nakamura, Chieko Nakanishi, Motoko Obayashi, Ikumi Ogake, Mika Saiki, Kiyomi Sakamoto, Asako Tajimi, Chiho Torii, Mika Yamauchi, and Tomoko Yoshihara. Head coach: Kuniaki Yoshida.

1999 FIVB World Cup — 6th place
Naomi Eto, Megumi Itabashi, Chikako Kumamae, Hitomi Mitsunaga, Junko Moriyama, Ikumi Ogake, Minako Onuki, Yuka Sakurai, Miki Sasaki, Hiromi Suzuki, Asako Tajimi, and Hiroko Tsukumo. Head coach: Nobushika Kuzuwa.
 2002 World Championship — 14th place
Makiko Horai, Sachiko Kodama, Chikako Kumamae, Hisako Mukai, Kanako Naito, Minako Onuki, Ai Otomo, Kana Oyama, Yuko Sano, Sachiko Sugiyama, Miyuki Takahashi, and Shinako Tanaka. Head coach: Masahiro Yoshikawa.

 2003 FIVB World Cup — 5th place
Tomoko Yoshihara, Chie Tsuji, Miki Sasaki, Kanako Omura, Yoshie Takeshita, Miyuki Takahashi, Makiko Horai, Yuko Sano, Sachiko Sugiyama, Saori Kimura, Kana Oyama, and Megumi Kurihara. Head coach: Shoichi Yanagimoto.

 2004 Olympic Qualification Tournament — 1st place (qualified)
Tomoko Yoshihara, Chie Tsuji, Ikumi Narita, Miki Sasaki, Kanako Omura, Yoshie Takeshita, Miyuki Takahashi, Sachiko Sugiyama, Ai Otomo, Kana Oyama, Megumi Kurihara, and Saori Kimura. Head coach: Shoichi Yanagimoto.

 2004 Olympic Games — 5th place (tied)
Tomoko Yoshihara, Chie Tsuji, Ikumi Narita, Miki Sasaki, Kanako Omura, Yoshie Takeshita, Miyuki Takahashi, Sachiko Sugiyama, Ai Otomo, Kana Oyama, Megumi Kurihara, and Saori Kimura. Head coach: Shoichi Yanagimoto.

 2005 FIVB World Grand Prix — 5th place
Erika Araki, Makiko Horai, Megumi Itabashi, Ayako Onuma, Ai Otomo, Yuka Sakurai, Miki Shimada, Kaoru Sugayama, Sachiko Sugiyama, Yoshie Takeshita, Miyuki Takahashi, and Chie Yoshizawa. Head coach: Shoichi Yanagimoto.

 2008 Olympic Qualification Tournament — 3rd place (qualified)
Erika Araki, Miyuki Kano, Yuki Kawai, Saori Kimura, Megumi Kurihara, Kanako Omura, Yuka Sakurai, Yuko Sano, Miyuki Takahashi, Sachiko Sugiyama, Yoshie Takeshita, and Asako Tajimi. Head coach: Shoichi Yanagimoto.

 2008 Olympic Games — 5th place (tied)
Erika Araki, Miyuki Kano, Yuki Kawai, Saori Kimura, Megumi Kurihara, Kanako Omura, Yuka Sakurai, Yuko Sano, Miyuki Takahashi, Sachiko Sugiyama, Yoshie Takeshita, and Asako Tajimi. Head coach: Shoichi Yanagimoto.

 2010 World Championship — 3rd place
Megumi Kurihara, Hitomi Nakamichi, Yoshie Takeshita, Kaori Inoue, Ai Yamamoto, Yuko Sano, Mai Yamaguchi, Mizuho Ishida, Erika Araki, Saori Kimura, Yukiko Ebata, Saori Sakoda, Akiko Ino, and Kanari Hamaguchi, Head coach: Masayoshi Manabe.

 2012 Olympic Games — Bronze Medal
Erika Araki (c), Saori Kimura, Yoshie Takeshita, Yukiko Ebata, Kaori Inoue, Ai Otomo, Yuko Sano, Mai Yamaguchi, Risa Shinnabe, Saori Sakoda, Maiko Kano, and Hitomi Nakamichi, Head coach: Masayoshi Manabe.

 2014 World Championship
Saori Kimura (c), Miyu Nagaoka, Hitomi Nakamichi, Arisa Takada, Arisa Satō, Mai Yamaguchi, Mizuho Ishida, Yuki Ishii, Risa Shinnabe, Yukiko Ebata, Saori Sakoda, Kana Ōno, Sayaka Tsutsui, and Haruka Miyashita, Head coach: Masayoshi Manabe.

 2016 Olympic Games — 5th place
Saori Kimura (c), Miyu Nagaoka, Arisa Satō, Mai Yamaguchi, Yuki Ishii, Saori Sakoda, Haruka Miyashita, Kanami Tashiro, Erika Araki, Yurie Nabeya, Haruyo Shimamura and Kotoki Zayasu, Head coach: Masayoshi Manabe.

  2018 World Championship — 6th Place
Nana Iwasaka (c), Koyomi Tominaga, Kanami Tashiro, Erika Araki, Mai Okumura, Haruyo Shimamura, Risa Shinnabe, Yuki Ishii, Sarina Koga, Ai Kurogo, Mami Uchiseto, Miyu Nagaoka, Kotoe Inoue, Mako Kobata, Head coach: Kumi Nakada.

 2020 Summer Olympics — 10th Place
Ai Kurogo, Sarina Koga, Haruyo Shimamura, Erika Araki (c), Yuki Ishii, Mayu Ishikawa, Kanami Okumura, Mako Kobata, Nichika Yamada, Kotona Hayashi and Aki Momii, Head coach: Kumi Nakada

Coaches history
 Tadayoshi Yokota
 Kuniaki Yoshida 
 Nobushika Kuzuwa
 Masahiro Yoshikawa
 Shoichi Yanagimoto (2003–2008)
 Masayoshi Manabe (2008–2016)
 Kumi Nakada (2016–2021)
 Masayoshi Manabe (2021–present)

Gallery

See also

Japan women's national under-23 volleyball team
Japan women's national under-20 volleyball team
Japan women's national under-18 volleyball team
Attack No. 1
Japan men's national volleyball team

References

External links
 
2020 roster
FIVB profile
Video of the moments of victory and of awarding gold medal in 1964 Tokyo Olympics

Volleyball women
Volleyball in Japan
National women's volleyball teams
World champion national volleyball teams